Chokri El Ouaer (born August 15, 1966) is a former Tunisian football goalkeeper.

The Tunisian international began playing for Espérance Sportive de Tunis in 1986, spending his entire career there except for a six-month spell in Genoa in 2001, near the end of his career. He retired shortly before the 2002 FIFA World Cup due to back problems, having announced his retirement on two previous occasions but persuaded to continue each time. Although he missed the 2002 World Cup he played at the 1998 FIFA World Cup. Chokri El Ouaer allegedly amassed near 100 caps for his country, but as with other Tunisian players this number is disputed by FIFA.

El Ouaer received attention in December 2000 when he was accused of faking an injury in the CAF Champions League final between Espérance and Hearts of Oak. During a lengthy stoppage towards the end of the game, Ouaer suddenly rushed towards the midfield with blood running down the side of his face. Claiming to be hit with a sharp object thrown by the spectators, the match referees had spotted the player inflicting the injury on himself. With Espérance on the verge of losing the match on away goals, it was believed that Ouaer attempted to get the game cancelled. When the match did continue, Espérance had to substitute him with an outfield player, resulting in a 1:3 loss.

External links
Bad back forces El Ouaer out - BBC
CAF set to rule on El Ouaer fake injury accusation - Ghanaweb

1966 births
Living people
Tunisian footballers
Tunisian expatriate footballers
1998 FIFA World Cup players
1994 African Cup of Nations players
1996 African Cup of Nations players
2000 African Cup of Nations players
2002 African Cup of Nations players
Footballers at the 1996 Summer Olympics
Olympic footballers of Tunisia
Tunisia international footballers
Serie B players
Genoa C.F.C. players
Tunisian Ligue Professionnelle 1 players
Espérance Sportive de Tunis players
Expatriate footballers in Italy
Footballers from Tunis
Association football goalkeepers